William José de Assis Filho (born 25 June 1933) is a Brazilian footballer. He played in six matches for the Brazil national football team in 1963. He was also part of Brazil's squad for the 1963 South American Championship.

References

External links
 

1933 births
Living people
Brazilian footballers
Brazil international footballers
Association football defenders
Sportspeople from Minas Gerais